The telautograph is an analog precursor to the modern fax machine. It transmits electrical impulses recorded by potentiometers at the sending station to servomechanisms attached to a pen at the receiving station, thus reproducing at the receiving station a drawing or signature made by the sender. It was the first such device to transmit drawings to a stationary sheet of paper; previous inventions in Europe had used rotating drums to make such transmissions.

Invention

The telautograph's invention is attributed to the American engineer Elisha Gray, who patented it on July 31, 1888. Gray's patent stated that the telautograph would allow "one to transmit his own handwriting to a distant point over a two-wire circuit." It was the first facsimile machine in which the stylus was controlled by horizontal and vertical bars. The telautograph was first publicly exhibited at the 1893 World's Columbian Exposition held in Chicago.

While the patent schema's geometry implies vertical and horizontal coordinates, systems used in the 20th century (and presumably before) had a different coordinate scheme, based on transmitting two angles.

In an 1888 interview in The Manufacturer & Builder (Vol. 24: No. 4: pages 85–86) Gray said:

By my invention you can sit down in your office in Chicago, take a pencil in your hand, write a message to me, and as your pencil moves, a pencil here in my laboratory moves simultaneously, and forms the same letters and words in the same way. What you write in Chicago is instantly reproduced here in fac-simile. You may write in any language, use a code or cipher, no matter, a fac-simile is produced here. If you want to draw a picture it is the same, the picture is reproduced here. The artist of your newspaper can, by this device, telegraph his pictures of a railway wreck or other occurrences just as a reporter telegraphs his description in words.

By the end of the 19th century, the telautograph was modified by Foster Ritchie. Calling it the telewriter, Ritchie's version of the telautograph could be operated using a telephone line for simultaneous copying and speaking.

Usage
The telautograph became very popular for the transmission of signatures over a distance, and in banks and large hospitals to ensure that doctors' orders and patient information were transmitted quickly and accurately.

Teleautograph systems were installed in a number of major railroad stations to relay hand-written reports of train movements from the interlocking tower to various parts of the station. The teleautograph network in Grand Central Terminal included a public display in the main concourse into the 1960s; a similar setup in Chicago Union Station remained in operation into the 1970s.

A Telautograph was used in 1911 to warn workers on the 10th floor about the Triangle Shirtwaist Factory fire that had broken out two floors below.

An example of a Telautograph machine writing script can be seen in the 1956 movie Earth vs the Flying Saucers as the output device for the mechanical translator. The 1936 movie Sinner Take All shows it being used in an office setting to secretly message instructions to a secretary.

Telautograph Corporation changed its name several times. In 1971, it was acquired by Arden/Mayfair. In 1993, Danka Industries purchased the company and renamed it Danka/Omnifax. In 1999, Xerox corporation purchased the company and called it the Omnifax division, which has since been absorbed by the corporation.

Machines like the Telautograph are still in use today. The Allpoint Pen is currently in use and has been used to register tens of thousands of voters in the United States, and the LongPen, an invention conceived of by writer Margaret Atwood, is used by authors to sign their books at a distance.

References

External links
Archive of Xerox Omnifax Division website, the successor to Telautograph Corporation.
Telautograph historical description

Patents

Patent images in TIFF format
 Art of Telegraphy, issued July 1888 (first telautograph patent)
 Telautograph, issued July 1888
Telautograph, issued October 1891
 Art of and Apparatus for Telautographic Communication, issued October 1891 (improved speed and accuracy)
 Telautograph, issued February 1893
 Telautograph, issued April 1893

American inventions
Xerox
Telecommunications equipment
Office equipment
Telegraphy
19th-century inventions